Anisimka is a rural locality (a village) in Krasnoplamenskoye Rural Settlement, Alexandrovsky District, Vladimir Oblast, Russia. The population was 2 as of 2010. There is 1 street.

Geography 
Anisimka is located on the Kubr River, 51 km northwest of Alexandrov (the district's administrative centre) by road. Obashevo is the nearest rural locality.

References 

Rural localities in Alexandrovsky District, Vladimir Oblast
Pereslavsky Uyezd